Gerald Alan Freedman (June 25, 1927 – March 17, 2020) was an American theatre director, librettist, and lyricist, and a college dean.

Life and career
Freedman was born in Lorain, Ohio, the son of Fannie (Sepenswol), a history teacher, and Barnie B. Freedman, a dentist. His parents were Russian Jewish immigrants. He was educated at Northwestern University under Alvina Krause and others. He earned both BA and MA degrees there. He began his career as assistant director of such projects as Bells Are Ringing, West Side Story, and Gypsy. His first credit as a Broadway director was the 1961 musical The Gay Life. Additional Broadway credits include the 1964 and 1980 revivals of West Side Story, The Incomparable Max (1971), Arthur Miller's The Creation of the World and Other Business (1972), the 1975 and 1976 productions of The Robber Bridegroom, both of which garnered him Drama Desk Award nominations as Outstanding Director of a Musical, The Grand Tour (1979) with Joel Grey, and The School for Scandal (1995) with Tony Randall. He was also the off-Broadway director of the rock musical Hair when it premiered at the Public Theater.

Freedman was leading artistic director (1960–1967) and artistic director (1967–1971) of Joseph Papp's New York Shakespeare Festival, artistic director of the Great Lakes Theater Festival in Cleveland, Ohio (1985–1997), and co-artistic director of John Houseman’s The Acting Company (1974–1977).  He taught at Yale School of Drama and the Juilliard School. He was Dean of the Drama School at the University of North Carolina School of the Arts (1991–2012). He was the first American ever invited to direct at the Globe Theatre in London. He was a member of the Kennedy Center New Play Committee and the College of Fellows of the American Theatre. He participated in the Oomoto Institute, Kameoka, Japan. He died on March 17, 2020, at his home in Winston-Salem, North Carolina of kidney failure.

Bibliography
  (theater program)
  (theater program)
  (theater program)
  (theater program)
  (theater program)
  (theater program)
  (theater program)
  (theater program)
 20 linear ft. (10850 items)
 Music Sound Recording 33 1/3 12 inch LP

References

External links

Gerald Freedman at the Internet Off-Broadway Database
Interview with Gerald Freedman about West Side Story

1927 births
2020 deaths
American theatre directors
American musical theatre lyricists
American musical theatre librettists
American Jews
Northwestern University School of Communication alumni
People from Lorain, Ohio
Juilliard School faculty
Yale University faculty
University of North Carolina School of the Arts faculty
Songwriters from Ohio
Deaths from kidney failure